Evrymenes may refer to:

Evrymenes, Ioannina, a municipal unit in Ioannina regional unit, Greece
Evrymenes, Larissa, a municipal unit in Larissa regional unit, Greece
Eurymenae, an ancient Greek city in Thessaly